Ophiopogon (lilyturf) is a genus of evergreen perennial plants  native to warm temperate to tropical East, Southeast, and South Asia. Despite their grasslike appearance, they are not closely related to the true grasses, the Poaceae. The name of the genus is derived from Greek ὄφις ophis, 'snake' and πώγων pogon, 'beard', most probably referring to its leaves and tufted growth. In the APG III classification system, it is placed in the family Asparagaceae, subfamily Nolinoideae (formerly the family Ruscaceae). Like many lilioid monocots, it was formerly classified in the Liliaceae.

They grow from short rhizomes, and bear tufts of leaves, from which flowers emerge in racemes held on short stems above the leaves.

Species

Cultivation and uses
Some species, such as O. japonicus and O. planiscapus, are used as ground-cover plants.

In Chinese medicine, the tuber of O. japonicus, known as mai men dong, is the cardinal herb for yin deficiency. According to the Chinese herbal medicine Materia Medica, the herb is sweet, slightly bitter, and slightly cold; it enters the heart, lung and stomach channels, thus nourishes the yin of the stomach, spleen, heart, and lungs, and clears heat and quiets irritability.  It is used for hacking dry coughs, dry tongue and mouth, and constipation. Liriope is used as a substitute.

References

 
Asparagaceae genera
Groundcovers